Marat Auzbiyevich Khoziyev (born 21 March 1982) is a Russian professional football official and a former player. He works as an administrator with FC Spartak Vladikavkaz.

Club career
He played in the Russian Football National League for FC Lada Togliatti in 2001.

References

1982 births
Living people
Russian footballers
FC Lada-Tolyatti players
FC Khimik-Arsenal players
Association football midfielders
FC Mashuk-KMV Pyatigorsk players